"Papa Bear" is a debut song written and recorded by American country music artist Keith Harling.  It was released in March 1998 as the first single from the album Write It in Stone.  The song reached No. 24 on the Billboard Hot Country Singles & Tracks chart.

Music video
Actor Dean Cain directed the song's music video.

Chart performance

References

Songs about fathers
1998 debut singles
1998 songs
Keith Harling songs
MCA Nashville Records singles